SZU may refer to:

 Sihltal Zürich Uetliberg Bahn, a railway company in Zürich, Switzerland
 Shenzhen University